Sohas (Uska) is a village of Maharajganj District, UP. It is located in Paniyaraa legislative assembly seat. It is at a distance of 10 km north form Paniyara and ~10 km south of Maharajganj Town.
The main profession of the villagers is Agriculture.

References

Villages in Maharajganj district